Ernest Whitter was an English professional footballer who played as an outside right.

Career
Born in Didsbury, Whitter spent his early career with Didsbury and Nelson. He signed for Bradford City from 'minor football' in August 1922, making 1 league appearance for the club, before moving to New Brighton in July 1924. He later played for Ashton National.

Sources

References

Date of birth missing
Date of death missing
English footballers
Nelson F.C. players
Bradford City A.F.C. players
New Brighton A.F.C. players
Ashton National F.C. players
English Football League players
Association football outside forwards